Houston Secondary is a public high school in Houston, British Columbia, part of School District 54 Bulkley Valley. The school enrolls approx 178 students and is the largest in the community. It serves as the secondary school for Houston and the surrounding rural communities.

References 
"Houston Secondary School - Home." Houston Secondary School. N.d. Web. Accessed 10 Sep. 2020 from: http://hssweb.sd54.bc.ca/

"Student Headcount by Grade."  Education Analytics, Government of BC.  n.d.  Web.  Accessed 5 Apr. 2021 from: https://catalogue.data.gov.bc.ca/dataset/bc-schools-student-headcount-by-grade/resource/c1a55945-8554-4058-9019-514b16178f89 (Line 81734)

External links 
 School District 54

High schools in British Columbia
Educational institutions in Canada with year of establishment missing